Lars Emil Anton Hansson, (born 7 May 1997) is a Swedish handball player, currently playing for VfL Potsdam.

He played for Ystads IF until 2018, when he signed for IFK Kristianstad. He played there for the season of 2018/19, and started the season of 2019/20 with them. However, in November 2019 it was announced he was leaving IFK Kristianstad for IFK Ystad right away. In 2020 he signed with the Danish Mors-Thy Håndbold, starting 2021/22.

Between 2013 and 2017 he played for the Swedish U19 and U21 national teams, with a total of 45 games and 64 goals.

References 

Swedish male handball players
1997 births
Living people
Ystads IF players
IFK Kristianstad players
21st-century Swedish people